Kootenai County is located in the U.S. state of Idaho. In 2020, the United States Census Bureau estimated the county's population at 171,362, making it the third-most populous county in Idaho and by far the largest in North Idaho, the county accounting for 45.4% of the region's total population. The county seat and largest city is Coeur d'Alene. The county was established in 1864 and named after the Kootenai tribe.

Kootenai County is coterminous with the Coeur d'Alene metropolitan area, which along with the Spokane metropolitan area comprises the Spokane–Coeur d'Alene combined statistical area.

History

Natives and early European activity
The Coeur d'Alene region takes its name from that given the local natives by French fur trappers.  The tribe initially consisted of three bands that inhabited the areas surrounding Coeur d'Alene Lake and the Coeur d'Alene River.  Canadian fur trade came to the region starting in 1809, marking the tribe's first contact with Europeans.  Christian missionaries would follow with the first Christian meeting officiated by Father Nicolas Pointe on the north bank of Coeur d'Alene Lake at its junction with the Spokane River on December 2, 1842.  The St. Joseph mission was initially established northwest of St. Maries in 1844 before being renamed Mission of the Sacred Heart at its relocation to the Cataldo site in 1846.  Construction of Idaho's oldest structure commenced with construction of the mission church being completed by 1855.  The mission headquarters was moved to DeSmet in 1877.

The Mullan Road was constructed through the area in 1859 with the route originally running on the southern side of Coeur d'Alene Lake.  A route on the northern side of Coeur D'Alene Lake commenced in 1861.  Mullan's men celebrated Independence Day of 1861 at Fourth of July Canyon east of Coeur d'Alene.

Kootenai County settled, fails to organize
The Idaho Territorial Legislature created Kootenai County on December 22, 1864.  A county government was not immediately organized as a result of lack of significant settlement in the region.  Kootenai County contained 81 residents at the 1864 Census of Idaho Territory.  Rathdrum was the first of the present incorporated cities to experience settlement starting in 1861.  It became a stagecoach stop and later the Kootenai County seat.  At the 1870 census, the region was reported under Nez Perce County as the Kootenai District with 31 residents.  Post Falls was settled in 1871 while Camp Coeur d'Alene was established in 1878.  The camp became a Fort in 1879 and the town of Coeur d'Alene grew up around the fort.  Dalton Gardens, Hayden, and Hayden Lake were also settled around this time.

Kootenai County organized
After almost 17 years of existence, Kootenai County finally organized on July 9, 1881.  The county's importance grew as a result of completion of the Northern Pacific Railway in 1882 to Rathdrum as well as discovery of gold on the Coeur d'Alene River in neighboring Shoshone County in 1883.  Existing settlements grew and new ones were established as a result.  Settlement commenced on the railroad at Athol in 1882 and Harrison in 1890.

Development of cities
Continued population growth led to the development of cities.  In 1899, Harrison was the county's first city to incorporate.  Coeur d'Alene, Spirit Lake, and Athol followed in 1906, 1908, and 1909.  Incorporation of Rathdrum Post Falls, and Worley occurred prior to 1920.  Clarksville, Hayden Lake, Huetter, State Line, and Eddiville were all incorporated in 1947.  Hayden, Dalton Gardens, and Fernan Lake incorporated after 1950.  Eddiville and Clarksville were dis-incorporated prior to 1970.

County boundary history
At the time of the Coeur d'Alene Mission's establishment, the territory of Kootenai County was claimed by both the United States and Britain.  The government of Oregon Country established four districts on July 5, 1843, and Kootenai's territory was within the boundary of the Clackamas District that later became Clackamas County under Oregon Territory.  Washington Territory was established March 2, 1853.  Kootenai's territory fell under Walla Walla County starting 1864, followed by Spokane County in 1858.  Idaho Territory was established March 3, 1863, resulting in Kootenai County's territory not falling under any county's jurisdiction.  On February 2, 1864, it was attached jurisdictionally to Nez Perce County, but remained outside of that county's boundary.  The Counties of Kootenai and Lah-Toh were created on December 22, 1864, with Lah-Toh covering Kootenai's present territory.  Both counties failed to organize and by 1867, Lah-Toh was abolished and its territory transferred to Kootenai County.  Bonner was partitioned off in 1907 and Benewah partitioned in 1915 to give Kootenai its present boundary.  In 1905, the legislature attempted to abolish Kootenai County and create the counties of Lewis and Clark in its place.  The act was declared unconstitutional by the Idaho Supreme Court.

Geography

The county water area includes Lake Coeur d'Alene and the southernmost portion of Lake Pend Oreille. Kootenai County is part of the Inland Empire in the Idaho Panhandle.

Adjacent counties
 Bonner County – north
 Shoshone County – east
 Benewah County – south
 Spokane County, Washington – west

National protected areas
 Coeur d'Alene National Forest (part)
 Kaniksu National Forest (part)

Major highways

Demographics

2000 census
As of the census of 2000, there were 108,685 people, 41,308 households, and 29,659 families living in the county.  The population density was 87 people per square mile (34/km2).  There were 46,607 housing units at an average density of 37 per square mile (14/km2).  The racial makeup of the county was 95.84% White, 0.17% Black or African American, 1.23% Native American, 0.50% Asian, 0.07% Pacific Islander, 0.59% from other races, and 1.60% from two or more races.  2.33% of the population were Hispanic or Latino of any race. 23.2% were of German, 11.9% English, 10.9% Irish, 9.4% American and 6.1% Norwegian ancestry. 96.6% spoke English and 1.7% Spanish as their first language.

There were 41,308 households, out of which 34.90% had children under the age of 18 living with them, 58.60% were married couples living together, 9.20% had a female householder with no husband present, and 28.20% were non-families. 21.90% of all households were made up of individuals, and 8.30% had someone living alone who was 65 years of age or older.  The average household size was 2.60 and the average family size was 3.03.

In the county, the population was spread out, with 27.10% under the age of 18, 8.70% from 18 to 24, 28.00% from 25 to 44, 23.90% from 45 to 64, and 12.30% who were 65 years of age or older.  The median age was 36 years. For every 100 females there were 98.10 males.  For every 100 females age 18 and over, there were 94.90 males.

The median income for a household in the county was $37,754, and the median income for a family was $42,905. Males had a median income of $33,661 versus $22,113 for females. The per capita income for the county was $18,430.  About 7.70% of families and 10.50% of the population were below the poverty line, including 12.90% of those under age 18 and 7.30% of those age 65 or over.

2010 census
As of the 2010 United States Census, there were 138,494 people, 54,200 households, and 37,316 families living in the county. The racial makeup of the county was 94.5% white, 1.3% American Indian, 0.7% Asian, 0.3% black or African American, 0.1% Pacific islander, 0.8% from other races, and 2.4% from two or more races. Those of Hispanic or Latino origin made up 3.8% of the population. In terms of ancestry, 25.9% were German, 15.2% were Irish, 13.9% were English, 12.5% were American, and 6.7% were Norwegian.

Of the 54,200 households, 32.8% had children under the age of 18 living with them, 53.9% were married couples living together, 10.0% had a female householder with no husband present, 31.2% were non-families, and 24.3% of all households were made up of individuals. The average household size was 2.53 and the average family size was 2.99. The median age was 38.9 years.

The median income for a household in the county was $46,336 and the median income for a family was $55,840. Males had a median income of $43,503 versus $29,950 for females. The per capita income for the county was $24,418. About 8.8% of families and 11.9% of the population were below the poverty line, including 15.3% of those under age 18 and 7.7% of those age 65 or over.

Politics

Communities

Cities

Athol
Coeur d'Alene
Dalton Gardens
Fernan Lake Village
Harrison
Hauser
Hayden
Hayden Lake
Huetter
Post Falls
Rathdrum
Spirit Lake
Stateline
Worley

Census-designated places
Conkling Park
Rockford Bay

Unincorporated communities

Bayview
Cataldo
Clarksville
Garwood
Lane
Medimont
North Pole

Education
School districts include:
 Coeur d'Alene School District 271
 Kellogg Joint School District 391
 Kootenai Joint School District 274
 Lakeland Joint School District 272
 Plummer-Worley Joint School District 44
 Post Falls School District 273

See also
National Register of Historic Places listings in Kootenai County, Idaho
Kootenai County Sheriff, Robert Norris

Footnotes

Further reading

External links

County website

 

 
Idaho counties
Idaho placenames of Native American origin
1864 establishments in Idaho Territory
Populated places established in 1864